Vladimir Kaganov (ru)
 Rafik Kadyrbulatov (ru)
 Akhmad Kadyrov
 Ramzan Kadyrov
 Murtazali Kazanalipov (ru)
 Viktor Kazantsev
 Pyotr Kazmin (ru)
 Zulkaid Kaidov (ru)
 Said-Magomed Kakiev
 Viktor Kalashnikov (ru)
 Mikhail Kalashnikov
 Aleksandr Kaleri
 Alikhan Kalimatov (ru)
 Aleksandr Kalinin (ru)
 Andrey Kalyapin (ru)
 Ivan Kamenskikh (ru)
 Valery Kanakin (ru)
 Yevgeny Kapustin (ru)
 Yunus Karaketov (ru)
 Boris Karasyov (ru)
 Okhid Kardanov (ru)
 Aleksandr Karelin
 Andrey Karlov
 Vladimir Karpushenko (ru)
 Oleg Kaskov (ru)
 Dmitry Kasperovich (ru)
 Ilya Kasyanov (ru)
 Artyom Katunkin (ru)
 Sergey Kachovsky (ru)
 Natalya Kachuevskaya
 Olga Kachura
 Leonid Kvasnikov
 Nikolai Kvasha (ru)
 Anatoly Kvashnin
 Anatoly Kvochur
 Sergey Kirienko
 Aleksey Kirillin (ru)
 Grigory Kirichenko (ru)
 Aleksandr Kiryanov (ru)
 Yevgeny Kiryushin (ru)
 Sergey Kislov (ru)
 Konstantin Kisten (ru)
 Roman Kitanin (ru)
 Gennady Kichkaylo (ru)
 Aleksandr Kishinsky (ru)
Aleksandr Klimov (ru)
 Dmitry Klimov (ru)
 Yuri Klimov (ru)
 Yevgeny Klochkov (ru)
 Rustem Klupov (ru)
 Viktor Klykov (ru)
 Oleg Klyuchnikov (ru)
 Anatoly Knyshov (ru)
 Aleksandr Kobin (ru)
 Sergey Kobylash (ru)
 Aleksandr Kovalyov (ru)
 George Koval
 Vladimir Kovtun (ru)
 Dmitry Kozhemyakin (ru)
 Igor Kozhin (ru)
 Konstantin Kozeev
 Aleksey Kozin (ru)
 Aleksey Kozlov
 Ilya Kozlov (ru)
 Oleg Kozlov (general)
 Oleg Kozlov (sniper) (ru)
 Shamil Kokinaev (ru)
 Ruslan Kokshin
 Aleksandr Kolgatin (ru)
 Yevgeny Kolesnikov (ru)
 Yuri Kolesnikov (ru)
 Ivan Kolos (ru)
 Nikolai Kolpakov (ru)
 Vladimir Kolybabinsky (ru)
 Aleksandr Komarov (ru)
 Aleksandr Komyagin (ru)
 Yelena Kondakova
 Dmitry Kondratyev 
 Aleksandr Konovalov (ru)
 Yuri Konovalov (ru)
 Oleg Kononenko (cosmonaut)
 Oleg Kononenko (pilot) (ru)
 Aleksandr Kononov (ru)
 Yevgeny Konopelkin (ru)
 Leonid Konstantinov (ru)
 Ivan Konyukhov (ru)
 Anatoly Kopyrkin (ru)
 Nikolai Kopytov (ru)
 Valentin Korabelnikov
 Aleksey Korablyov (ru)
 Vladimir Korgutov (ru)
 Valery Korzun
 Igor Kornienko (ru)
 Mikhail Kornienko
Anatoly Korobenkov (ru)
 Igor Korobov
 Roman Korovushkin (ru)
 Arkady Korolkov (ru)
 Sergey Korolkov (ru)
 Viktor Korostiev (ru)
 Anatoly Korochensky (ru)
 Ivan Korchagin (ru)
 Sergey Korshunov (ru)
 Sergey Kosachyov (ru)
 Nikolai Kostechko (ru)
 Viktor Kostin (ru)
 Sergey Kostin (ru)
 Abubakar Kostoev (major) (ru)
 Abubakar Kostoev (colonel) (ru)
 Shirvani Kostoev
 Valentin Kostyukov (ru)
 Igor Kostyukov
 Akhmed Kotiev (ru)
 Oleg Kotov
 Yevgeny Kocheshkov (ru)
 Stanislav Kravtsov (ru)
 Valentina Kravchenko
 Aleksandr Krasikov (ru)
 Aleksandr Krasnikov (ru)
 Konstantin Krasnikov (ru)
 Andrey Krasov
 Andrey Krestyaninov (ru)
 Pavel Kretov (ru)
 Sergey Krikalyov
 Vyacheslav Kritsky (ru)
 Ivan Kropochev (ru)
 Vyacheslav Krotevich (ru)
 Aleksandr Kruzhalin (ru)
 Anatoly Krupinov (ru)
 Aleksandr Krutov (ru)
 Oleg Kryukov (ru)
 Oleg Kublin (ru)
 Artyom Kuzin (ru)
 Aleksandr Kuznetsov (sergeant) (ru)
 Aleksandr Kuznetsov (major) (ru)
 Sergey Kuzmin (ru)
 Fyodor Kuzmin (ru)
 Mikhail Kuzmichyov (ru)
 Nikolai Kuimov (ru)
 Yevgeny Kukarin (ru)
 Valery Kukov (ru)
 Roman Kulakov (ru)
 Nikita Kulkov (ru)
 Andrey Kumov (ru)
 Khadzhimurat Kurakhmaev (ru)
 Artur Kurbangaleev (ru)
 Abdulkhalik Kurbanov (ru)
 Ivan Kurbatov (ru)
 Yuri Kurganov (ru)
 Sergey Kurnosenko (ru)
 Aleksey Kuroedov (ru)
 Yuri Kuryagin (ru)
 Sergey Kustov (ru)
 Boris Kuchin (ru)
 Oleg Kuyanov (ru)
 Anatoly Kyarov
 Ryafagat Khabibullin (ru)
 Kachibatyr Khairkizov (ru)
 Gazinur Khayrullin (ru)
 Radim Khalikov (ru)
 Aleksandr Khamitov (ru)
 Umarpasha Khanaliev (ru)
 Stanislav Kharin (ru)
 Nikolai Kharkov (ru)
 Moldi Khatuev (ru)
 Sergey Khikhin (ru)
 Oleg Khmelyov (ru)
 Andrey Khmelevskoy (ru)
 Vsevolod Khmyrov (ru)
 Igor Khomenko (ru)
 Grigory Khoperskov (ru)
 Aleksandr Khokhlachyov (ru)
 Anatoly Khramov (ru)
 Sergey Khraptsov (ru)

References 
 

Heroes K